Following is a list of notable Swiss architects:

A–M

Anton Aberle (1876-1953)
Antonio Adamini (1792-1846)
Karl Eduard Aeschlimann (1808-1893)
Giocondo Albertolli (1743-1839)
Adolphe Appia (1862-1928)
Hans Wilhelm Auer (1847-1906)
Erwin Friedrich Baumann (1890-1980)
Alexander Bernardazzi (1831–1907)
Giuseppe Bernardazzi (1816-1891)
Melchior Berri (1801-1854)
Max Bill (1908-1994)
Alfred Friedrich Bluntschli (1842-1930)
Francesco Borromini (1599-1667)
Mario Botta (born 1943)
Markus Breitschmid (born 1966)
Wilhelm Eduard Brodtbeck (1873-1957)
Arnold Bürkli (1833-1894)
Alberto Camenzind (1914-2004)
Gion A. Caminada (born 1957)
Giovanni Catenazzi (1660-1724)
Christian Constantin
Justus Dahinden (1925-2020)
Andrea Deplazes (born 1960)
Roger Diener (born 1950)
Max Dudler (born 1949)
Karl Egender (1897-1969)
Hans Caspar Escher (1775-1859)
Hans Fischli (1909-1989)
Józef Fontana (1676-c. 1739)
 Albert Frey (1903-1998)
Max Frisch (1911-1991)
Joseph-Antoine Froelicher (1790-1866)
Aurelio Galfetti (born 1936)
Bruno Giacometti (1907-2012)
Ernst Gisel (born 1922)
Camille Graeser (1892-1980)
Lux Guyer (1894-1955)
Jacques Herzog (born 1950)
Pierre Jeanneret (1896-1967)
Iachen Ulrich Könz (1899-1980)
Inès Lamunière (born 1954)
Alphonse Laverrière (1872-1954)
Le Corbusier (1887-1965)
Charles l'Eplattenier (1874-1946)
Gret Loewensberg (born 1943)
Carlo Maderno (c. 1555-1629)
Jean-Daniel Masserey (born 1972)
Pierre de Meuron (born 1950)
Hannes Meyer (1889-1954)
Karl Moser (1860-1936)
Werner Max Moser (1896-1970)

N–Z

Valerio Olgiati (born 1958)
Giacomo Palearo (1520/30–1586) 
Alexandre Perregaux (1749-1808)
Louis Perrier (1849-1913)
Louis-Daniel Perrier (1818-1903)
Hans Konrad Pestalozzi (1848–1909)
Daniel Pfister (1808–1847)
Adrien Pichard (1790-1841)
Gaetano Matteo Pisoni (1713-1782)
Paolo Antonio Pisoni (1738-1804)
Joseph Plepp (1595-1642)
Benjamin Recordon (1845-1938)
Luigi Rusca (1762-1822)
James of Saint George (1229-1308)
Otto Rudolf Salvisberg (1882-1940)
Alexander von Senger (1880-1968)
Carl Ahasver von Sinner (1754-1821)
Luigi Snozzi (born 1932)
Santino Solari (1575-1646)
Ferdinand Stadler (1813-1870)
Peter Steiger (born 1960)
Flora Steiger-Crawford (1899-1991)
Arnold Sutermeister (1830-1907)
Domenico Trezzini (c. 1670-1734)
Bernard Tschumi (born 1944)
Jean Tschumi (1904-1962)
Maurice Turrettini (1878-1932)
Livio Vacchini (1933-2007)
Peter Vetsch (born 1943)
Christian Waldvogel
Hans Wittwer (1894-1952)
Bruno Weber (1931-2011)
Samuel Werenfels (1720-1800)
Pierre Zoelly (1923-2003)
Enrico Zuccalli (c. 1642-1724)
Peter Zumthor (born 1943)

See also

 List of architects
 List of Swiss people

References

Swiss
Architects